Fundo El Carmen Airport) is an airport  east of Chillán, a city in the Bío Bío Region of Chile. The runway lies alongside the south bank of the Chillán River.

See also

Transport in Chile
List of airports in Chile

References

External links
OpenStreetMap - Fundo El Carmen
OurAirports - Fundo El Carmen

FallingRain - Fundo El Carmen Airport

Airports in Ñuble Region